The 2017 Los Cabos Open (also known as the Abierto Mexicano de Tenis Mifel presentado por Cinemex for sponsorship reasons) was an ATP tennis tournament played on outdoor hard courts. It was the 2nd edition of the Los Cabos Open, and part of the ATP World Tour 250 series of the 2017 ATP World Tour. It took place in Los Cabos, Mexico from July 31 through August 6, 2017.

Singles main-draw entrants

Seeds 

 Rankings are as of July 24, 2017.

Other entrants 
The following players received wildcards into the singles main draw:
  Tomáš Berdych
  Thanasi Kokkinakis
  Manuel Sánchez

The following players received entry from the qualifying draw:
  Matthew Ebden
  Quentin Halys
  Evan King
  Akira Santillan

The following player entered as a lucky loser:
  Brydan Klein

Withdrawals
Before the tournament
  James Duckworth →replaced by  Jason Jung
  Víctor Estrella Burgos →replaced by  Vincent Millot
  Blaž Kavčič →replaced by  Brydan Klein
  Karen Khachanov →replaced by  Dennis Novikov

Doubles main-draw entrants

Seeds 

 Rankings are as of July 24, 2017.

Other entrants 
The following pairs received wildcards into the doubles main draw:
  Matthew Ebden /  Manuel Sánchez
  Hans Hach Verdugo /  Miguel Ángel Reyes-Varela

Champions

Singles 

  Sam Querrey def.  Thanasi Kokkinakis 6–3, 3–6, 6–2.

Doubles 

   Juan Sebastián Cabal /  Treat Huey def.  Sergio Galdós /  Roberto Maytín, 6–2, 6–3.

References

External links 
 

Los Cabos Open
2017 in Mexican tennis
2017